National Taiwan Ocean University (NTOU) is a national university in Zhongzheng District, Keelung, Taiwan. NTOU is a member of University System of Taipei.

History
NTOU was originally established as the Provincial Taiwan Maritime Technology College in 1953. In 1979, it was renamed National Taiwan College of Marine Science and Technology. Ten years later, the institution underwent another name change, to National Taiwan Ocean University. A satellite opened on Beigan, Lienchiang in July 2019 as the first university campus on the Matsu Islands.

Colleges, Departments, and Institutes

College of Maritime Science and Management
Department of Merchant Marine
Department of Shipping and Transportation Management
Department of Transportation Science
Department of Marine Engineering
Bachelor Degree Program in Ocean Business Management
College of Life Sciences
Department of Food Science
Department of Aquaculture
Department of Bioscience and Biotechnology
Institute of Marine Biology
Institute of Food Safety and Risk Management
Bachelor Degree Program in Marine Biotechnology
Doctoral Degree Program in Marine Biotechnology
College of Ocean Science and Resource
Department of Environmental Biology and Fisheries Science
Department of Marine Environmental Informatics
Institute of Earth Sciences
Institute of Marine Affairs and Resource Management
Institute of Marine Environment and Ecology
Doctoral Degree Program in Ocean Resource and Environmental Changes
College of Engineering
Department of Mechanical and Mechatronics Engineering
Department of Systems Engineering and Naval Architecture
Department of Harbor and River Engineering
Institute of Materials Engineering
Bachelor Degree Program in Ocean Engineering Technology
Doctoral Degree Program in Ocean Engineering Technology
College of Electrical Engineering and Computer Science
Department of Electrical and Electronics Engineering
Department of Computer Science and Engineering
Department of Communications, Navigations, and Control Engineering
Department of Optoelectronics and Materials Technology
Institute of Optoelectronic Sciences
College of Humanities and Social Sciences
Institute of Applied Economics
Institute of Education
Institute of Oceanic Culture
Institute of Applied English
Teacher Education Center
College of Ocean Law and Policy
Bachelor Degree Program in Ocean Law and Policy
Institute of the Law of the Sea
Master Degree Program in Ocean Policy
General Education Center
Center of Excellence for the Oceans
Taiwan Marine Education Center
Maritime Development and Training Center

Ranking

Notable alumni
 Chang Tong-rong, Mayor of Keelung City (2007–2014)
 Fan Chen-tsung, Minister of Council of Agriculture (2002)
 Lee I-yang, Minister of the Interior (2006–2008)
 Liu Wen-hsiung, member of Legislative Yuan (1999–2008)
 Lu Tien-lin, Minister of Council of Labor Affairs (2007–2008)
 Wu Nai-ren, Secretary-General of Democratic Progressive Party (2000–2002, 2009, 2010)

See also
 List of universities in Taiwan
 Maritime industries of Taiwan
 National Keelung Maritime Vocational High School

References

External links

NTOU official website

 
Educational institutions established in 1953
1953 establishments in Taiwan
Universities and colleges in Taiwan
Technical universities and colleges in Taiwan